Atomaria linearis is a species of silken fungus beetle native to Europe. According to the European and Mediterranean Plant Protection Organization (EPPO) the common name of the species is pygmy mangold beetle

References

External links
Images representing Atomaria at BOLD
EPPO database 

Cryptophagidae
Beetles described in 1830
Beetles of Europe